Flandin is a French surname. Notable people with the surname include:

Eugène Flandin (1809–1889), French painter
Hervé Flandin (born 1965), French biathlete
Pierre-Étienne Flandin (1889–1959), French politician

See also
Louis A. Bertrand (1808–1875), leader of the Church of Jesus Christ of Latter-day Saints, was born John Francis Elias Flandin

French-language surnames